The Non-Sectarian Anti-Nazi League to Champion Human Rights (originally the American League for the Defense of Jewish Rights) was founded in 1933 by Samuel Untermyer to enact an economic boycott against Nazi Germany.

Founding 
A champion for Jewish rights, Samuel Untermyer was among the most outspoken critics of the Hitler regime, advocating an international boycott of Germany through the League of Nations. He led the league until his retirement in 1938, remaining involved in its activities until his death in 1940. Throughout the 1930s, allied with groups such as the American Federation of Labor, the league tried to persuade American businesses to stop purchasing merchandise from Germany, exposing the ones that continued selling Nazi-made goods in their bulletin. They also tried to stop Americans from visiting Germany, thereby stopping any money from coming in. Among its many boycotts were ones against the 1936 Olympics in Berlin and the Schmeling – Louis boxing match in 1938. They also lobbied the United States government, asking it to investigate various things, including pro-Nazi propaganda activities in the U.S. by organizations such as Welt-Dienst/World Service founded by Ulrich Fleischhauer. The League also tried to educate the public through talks on radio and by distributing printed material. It also provided information to Martin Dies and his House Un-American Activities Committee.

James Sheldon Era 
The League, under the new leadership of James H. Sheldon, a former professor at Boston University, changed its mission to directly investigate right-wing propaganda groups. Among them were the Christian Front of Father Coughlin, the Christian Mobilizers of Joseph McWilliams and the American First of Gerald L. K. Smith. They had also begun to support the civil rights movement voicing their approval for the Fair Employment Practice Commission (FEPC) and various other anti-discrimination laws. In 1945 it filed a lawsuit against Columbia University to have its tax-exempt status revoked for discrimination against Jews. After World War Two the League also unsuccessfully tried to have the Nuremberg court prosecute the Grand Mufti of Jerusalem for having aided Hitler during the war.

The League was able to successfully combat the resurgence of hate groups in the U.S. by infiltrating the Ku Klux Klan. It was also instrumental in shutting down the Columbians, an Atlanta, Georgia-based group hate group, by hiring Stetson Kennedy to infiltrate the group. The league continued its investigation and exposure activities through the 1950s. Through the 1960s and the first half of the 1970s, the league continued to maintain an office on 46th street in New York, but it served mostly as a repository, with information flowing in but minimal action being taken. The League terminated in 1975 with the death of its head, James H. Sheldon.

Archives 
Shortly after Sheldon's death, the archives of the League were entrusted to the Columbia University Libraries Rare Books and Manuscripts Division where they are, today, accessible to scholars and researchers.

References

External links 
 FBI Data about the League
 Records of the Non-Sectarian Anti-Nazi League to Champion Human Rights at the Rare Book and Manuscript Library, Columbia University, New York

World War II resistance movements
Boycotts of Nazi Germany
Jewish-American history
Anti-fascist organizations in the United States
1933 establishments in the United States
1975 disestablishments in the United States
Jewish organizations based in the United States
Organizations established in 1933
Organizations disestablished in 1975